"Hit My Heart" is the third single from the album Porcelain by English recording artist Matt Cardle. The song was released in the United Kingdom on 6 April 2014 as a digital download, as well as a limited number of copies on CD and vinyl. The song was written by Cardle, his former manager Will Talbot, and Ben Cullum.  It was produced by Cardle, Tom Peters and Ash Howes.

Background
The song "begins deceptively with its ethereal intro and stop-start rhythmic verses but eventually develops into a chorus that’s pure euphoria and allows him to demonstrate his skills as an arranger and producer"  Cardle describes it as the albums "pop moment".

A radio edit of the song was first played on Ken Bruce's show on BBC Radio 2 on 24 February 2014.  The single was made available to pre-order exclusively from his official website as a red 7 inch vinyl, including the radio edit and an instrumental, and on CD, including the radio edit, a cover of the Clive Gregson song "It's All Just Talk" and acoustic versions of "When We Collide" and album track "This Trouble Is Ours".

Track listing
 Digital download
 "Hit My Heart" (Radio Edit) – 3:17

 CD Single
 "Hit My Heart" (Radio Edit) – 3:17
 "It's All Just Talk" 
 "When We Collide" (Acoustic Version)
 The Trouble Is Ours (Acoustic Version)

 Red 7 Inch Vinyl
 "Hit My Heart" (Radio Edit) – 3:17
 "Hit My Heart" (Instrumental) – 3:17

Chart performance

Weekly charts

Release history

References

2014 songs
Matt Cardle songs
2014 singles
Songs written by Matt Cardle